Al Rayyan is a municipality in Qatar.

Al Rayyan, Ar Rayyan, etc. may also refer to:

Places
 Al Rayyan (city), a city in the east of Al Rayyan municipality, Qatar 
 Al-Rayyan, Syria
 Ar Rayyan, Saudi Arabia
 Wadi El Rayan, a nature reserve in Egypt

Organisations
 Al-Rayyan SC, a Qatari professional sports club 
 Alrayyan TV, a Qatari media company 
 Al Rayan Bank, a British Islamic bank

See also
 Rayan, a name
 Rayan, Idlib, a village in Syria 
 Rayyan Sarafand, a Lebanese football club